Philippe Durel (born 13 August 1954) is a former French racing cyclist. He rode in the 1978 and 1980 Tour de France.

References

External links
 

1954 births
Living people
French male cyclists
Sportspeople from Manche
Cyclists from Normandy